Solas is a character in BioWare's Dragon Age franchise. He first appears in the 2014 video game Dragon Age: Inquisition, where he serves as a party member. He presents himself as an elven outlaw mage who operates outside of the edicts of the Chantry, the dominant religious organization in Thedas, the world setting of Dragon Age.  Solas joins the Inquisition and serves as an expert on the Fade, a metaphysical realm that is tied to Thedas which is normally accessible only through dreaming, and its denizens. His knowledge and expertise prove instrumental in aiding the  Inquisition's struggle to close the Breach, a massive dimensional tear in the sky that allows multitudes of demonic spirits to pass through into the physical world through dimensional rifts. A post-credit scene of  Inquisition reveals his true identity as Fen'Harel. Trespasser, the final DLC pack released for Inquisition, provides further insight into his backstory and motives, as well as his involvement in the current world state of Thedas. 

Solas is the focal point of pre-release promotional efforts for the upcoming fourth mainline entry in the Dragon Age video game series – titled Dragon Age: Dreadwolf after his sobriquet. He is voiced by Welsh actor Gareth David-Lloyd.

Development

Solas was written by Patrick Weekes, with heavy input from lead writer David Gaider, although the character was originally conceived and named prior to Weekes joining the project. In an interview, Weekes said that aspects of Solas' characterization was based on David Tennant's Doctor Who performance, who successfully conveyed the character's humanity as well as ancient nature in their view. Weekes noted that writing a character with hidden depths like Solas provided a great deal of both difficulty and opportunity. The character is depicted within an in-game cutscene as disdaining tea. Besides the fact that tea, particularly caffeinated tea, is a stimulant which may hinder Solas from crossing into the Fade during sleep, the character's dislike of tea also reflects Weekes' personal dislike of tea.

Originally, Solas was not available as a romance option in Inquisition; according to Mike Laidlaw, BioWare redesigned him as a potential love interest for a female elven Inquisitor when they extended the game's development for a year. Weekes noted that this was an opportunity to increase the basic sadness of the character. Solas will initiate the breakup of his relationship with the Inquisitor at the conclusion of the romance subplot, regardless of the player's choices.

In a video uploaded on BioWare's official YouTube channel titled "What Makes a Good Character?", Weekes used Harry Potter as a metaphor to explain how Solas perceives himself as the hero of the story; he feels he is "this luckless, unfortunate person who by an unpleasant destiny and the simple fact that no one else has the ability to do it, that it has to be him and that someone else would get it wrong".
 
During a Q&A session at the Phoenix Fan Fest 2015, Gareth David-Lloyd revealed that he recorded voice work for Solas over a period of two and a half years. He was provided with a simple outline and some lines on a screen to work with in lieu of a comprehensive backstory for Solas; he eventually developed a stronger idea of who the character is about three or four months after he started.

In Inquisition, Solas sometimes speaks in poetic meter, and the player character will gain approval when replying in kind. This is a deliberate design choice, given his characterization and personality.

Visual design
Solas is envisioned by Weekes to be a middle-aged man in his early to mid-forties. His appearance is reflective of a wandering nomad's lifestyle, who journeys from place to place without a set destination. BioWare's designers intended Solas to appear as if he is wearing all that he owns, and that his items of clothing are meant to look like homemade improvisations born from necessity.

Concept art displayed in The Art of Dragon Age Inquisition book shows the creative process for Solas as the team develops his look after many renditions to match the ideas provided by other creative teams. After exploring many different hairstyles, the final decision was made to design Solas with a bold, bald head. This is intended to evoke a sense of ageless wisdom required by his character.

Appearances

Dragon Age: Inquisition
During the opening sequence of events in Inquisition, Solas is encountered fighting demons alongside Varric Tethras and a few Inquisition personnel. This follows the aftermath of a massive explosion at a peace conference which killed everyone present, except for the protagonist, who was discovered emerging from a Fade rift.Solas presents himself to the fledgling Inquisition's leadership as a self-taught hedge mage who spends much of his time dreaming in ancient ruins and learning about what lies beyond the Veil, a metaphysical barrier which normally prevents direct physical access between the physical world and the Fade. This enables him to wields powers developed outside of conventional teaching and who has no affiliation with the Chantry-sanctioned Circle of Magi or any Dalish clan. Claiming that he is able to help the sole survivor of the Divine Conclave's explosion and the suspiciously glowing mark on their hand with the use of healing magic and minor wards, he is granted permission to study the survivor and one of the smaller rifts in order to find a way to seal the Breach. He later helps the survivor seal a small rift shortly after their meeting, and then follows them to the Temple itself to close the first and largest rift, which he theorizes would stabilize the Breach. 

After the survivor assumes the role of the Inquisitor and successfully enlists the help of either the mages or the templars, Solas provides assistance with closing the Breach itself. Following the destruction of the Inquisition's base in Haven by Corypheus, the perpetrator of the Breach, Solas explains that the orb that Corypheus wields is meant to channel ancient magics and of elven origin. He worries that if the orb's origin were to be revealed, it may have negative consequences for the reputation of the elven people. He then guides the Inquisitor to Skyhold, a disused fortress located in the Frostback Mountains that the Inquisition could claim as its new headquarters.

When the Inquisitor finally defeats Corypheus and stops him from opening another rift, with the orb being damaged permanently in the process, a distraught Solas laments the destruction of the orb as the loss of yet another elven artifact. He disappears shortly afterwards without a trace. In the post-credits scene it is revealed that Solas is Fen'Harel, an ancient being who is a member of the elven pantheon of gods, and a recurring trickster figure in Dragon Age lore.

Trespasser
In the midst of investigating a Qunari plot to invade Thedas, two years after the defeat of Corypheus, the Inquisitor encounters several elven ruins and learns that the elven pantheon of deities, the Evanuris, were in fact extremely powerful mages as opposed to being divine beings. The Inquisitor eventually encounters the Viddasala, the leader of the Qunari plot, and learns that agents supposedly working for Fen'Harel have been disrupting the Qunari plot; concurrently, the Inquisitor is losing control of the Anchor, threatening their life. The Inquisitor foils the plot and follows the Viddasala into the Eluvian network to confront Solas, despite the Anchor growing increasingly out of control.

After petrifying the Viddasala, Solas calms the Anchor and explains his motivations to the Inquisitor. He confesses to being Fen'Harel, who led a rebellion against the Evanuris after they became corrupt and abused their power. He created the Veil to seal away the Evanuris after they murdered Mythal, sundering the physical world and the Fade permanently, and in doing so dooming the civilization of the ancient elves to collapse due to its dependency on magic. Remorseful over his direct role in the downfall of his people, Solas now plans to unmake the Veil he created millennia ago and restore the ancient elven world by reuniting the physical world and the Fade, being fully aware that this act may potentially destroy the world in its present state and killing countless lives in the process. He also admits to engineering the events which led to the Breach, albeit inadvertently; he arranged for Corypheus to obtain his orb, anticipating that the ancient darkspawn would unlock it on his behalf as he had awakened from millennia of slumber in the Fade and was too weak as a result. Anticipating that Corypheus would destroy himself in the subsequent explosion. Solas intended to retrieve the orb and use the Anchor to achieve his goal. Realizing later that Corypheus survived the orb's destructive power, he joined the Inquisition to guide the organization into defeating him and his forces. Solas also reveals that he has double agents working within the Inquisition and he deliberately allowed the Qunari's Dragon's Breath plot to be discovered so that the Inquisitor may discover and thwart it. He then amputates the Inquisitor's arm to prevent the Anchor from killing them and leaves.

Upon returning to the Winter Palace in Orlais, the Inquisitor either disbands the Inquisition or reforms the organization into a smaller peacekeeping force to serve directly under Divine Victoria, risking weaker efforts against Solas or further infiltration in their ranks respectively. Due to Solas' familiarity with the workings of the Inquisition, the Inquisitor resolves to recruit new allies who are beyond his sphere of influence. An epilogue reveals that, following the failure of the Viddasala's plot, many elven individuals across Thedas have disappeared.

Promotion
Solas has been the focus for much of the media coverage pertaining to information released by BioWare about the fourth instalment of the Dragon Age video game series. His "Dread Wolf" sobriquet, and associated imagery is the focus of a sixty-second promotional trailer released by BioWare during the 5th annual The Game Awards show in December 2018. On social media, this teaser was paired with the hashtag "#TheDreadWolfRises". On June 2, 2022, the upcoming Dragon Age 4 title was announced as Dragon Age: Dreadwolf with Solas being advertised as the game's antagonist. The press release stated that "using Solas's namesake no doubt suggests a spectrum of endless possibilities on where things may go. [...] If you're new to Dragon Age, you have no need to worry about not having met our antagonist just yet. He'll properly introduce himself when the time is right".

Reception

Patricia Hernandez of Kotaku was fascinated by the plot twist in the post-credit scene of Inquisition which reveals his true identity. She observed that the reveal was a subject of intense discussion by Dragon Age fandom on social media at the time. She concludes that "the ending is a cliffhanger, and a damn good one at that". Kat Brewster from IGN called Solas "the dear elven pal we love to hate and hate to love", and his reveal "true BioWare trickery". His bald visage would become associated with that of an egg or egghead by Dragon Age fandom.

Gita Jackson from Kotaku dislikes the character on a personal level, but acknowledges him as a complex and well-written character. The opening paragraph of her opinion piece reads: "Solas is one of the best-written characters in video games. It's hard for me to think of a character whose loathsome worldview is so well developed, who, even when he's on your side, manages to be a complete piece of shit about everything. He is a such a great character that I want to strangle that dude with my bare hands". In her opinion piece published in response to Jackson's article about Solas, Angela D. Mitchell finds the character "too complex, too trapped, and too tragic" for her to despise.

Alison Bell from Videogamer.com believed that the potential romantic relationship between Solas and the Inquisitor is the best written romance in a video game so far, although she compared it to that of a Shakespearean tragedy: "histrionic, ruinous, and, in the long term, one or both of you is probably going to die." Ash Parrish, for The Verge, commented that Solas was initially "one of the least interesting of companions" until the endgame reveal and that "despite his overtly asshole behavior, there was a quiet confidence about him that some players found attractive enough to want to romance him".

In her analysis of a promotional trailer for the upcoming game released in December 2018, Brewster remarked that "The Dread Wolf had been hiding in tapestries and lore all since Origins". Parrish, for The Verge in June 2022, wrote that, "Solas, for a lot of players, was an ally, a trusted friend, and even a romantic partner. Then, he betrayed them, helping them save the world only to turn around and promise its destruction for anybody who doesn't look like him. [...] And while we probably won't be able to play as our Inquisitor characters again, I take great, gleeful pleasure in the knowledge that I'll be able to get some revenge on her behalf". Parrish highlighted that the title reveal for the fourth game – Dragon Age: Dreadwolf – was "exciting for a lot of fans" because it not only makes Solas the antagonist of the next game but also makes the game a direct sequel unlike previous instalments in the franchise.

See also
Elves in fiction
List of fictional tricksters

References

Further reading

External links
Solas on the official Dragon Age: Inquisition website
The Sound and the Fury: What we listened to while writing Dragon Age: Inquisition
Character Kit of Solas on the official BioWare blog

Deity characters in video games
Dragon Age characters
Elves in popular culture
Fantasy video game characters
Fictional gods
Fictional elves
Fictional revolutionaries
Fictional tricksters
Male characters in video games
Male video game villains
Video game characters introduced in 2014
Video game characters who use magic
Video game characters with slowed ageing
Video game sidekicks